Oppanakara Street is a street in Coimbatore, India. It is located close to the Town Hall area and Coimbatore Corporation building. Many commercial establishments can be found there, making it as one of the  busiest  commercial  street in the city and in India.

General
The street lies between South Ukkadam on one end and Mill Road on the other end. On the street many commercial establishments can be found ranging from street hawkers selling safety pins to big stores selling gold jewellery. Coimbatore is the textile hub of India and many textile showrooms occupy Oppanakara Street. Many of the city's oldest commercial establishments are on Oppanakara Street. Buses from Ukkadam use this road.

The street is full of people during festival times, and heavy pedestrian traffic comes from shopping at the textile/garment stores.

Commercial shops

Commercial shops established on Oppanakara Street include:
 Pothys
 The Chennai Silks (2 showrooms)
 Uday Textiles
 Ganapathy Silks
 Ramraj Cotton
 Saravana Selvarathnam Stores
 SPP Silks
 Thangamayil Jewellery 
 Kumaran Thangamaligai (2 showrooms)
 Joy Alukkas Jewellery
 Malabar gold and Diamonds

References 

Streets in India
Roads in Coimbatore
Shopping districts and streets in India